Steven M. Costantino (born June 16, 1957) is an American politician who is a former Democratic member of the Rhode Island House of Representatives, representing the 8th District since 1995. His term ended in January 2011. During the 2009-2010 sessions he served as chairman of the House Finance Committee. In June, 2010 he announced that he would not run for another term and that he would be running as mayor of Providence, Rhode Island.  He lost in the 2010 Democratic primary for the mayor to Angel Taveras.

He served as Secretary of Health and Human Services under Governor Lincoln Chafee.

References

External links
Rhode Island House - Representative Steven Costantino RI Secretary of State website

Democratic Party members of the Rhode Island House of Representatives
1957 births
Living people
Politicians from Providence, Rhode Island
State cabinet secretaries of Rhode Island